Folorunso "Foley" Okenla (born 9 October 1967) is a Nigerian retired professional footballer who played in England, Belgium and Canada.

Career
Okenla was on the books of English club Burnley, without playing for them in the Football League, before making seven appearances in the Football League Third Division for Birmingham City on a non-contract basis. He later played in the Belgian Second Division for K.V. Turnhout and in the American Professional Soccer League for Canadian club the Montreal Impact.

References

1967 births
Living people
Sportspeople from Ibadan
Nigerian footballers
Nigeria international footballers
1988 African Cup of Nations players
Burnley F.C. players
Birmingham City F.C. players
KFC Turnhout players
Montreal Impact (1992–2011) players
Challenger Pro League players
English Football League players
American Professional Soccer League players
Nigerian expatriate footballers
Expatriate footballers in England
Expatriate footballers in Belgium
Expatriate soccer players in Canada
Association football wingers
Nigerian expatriates in England
Nigerian expatriates in Belgium
Nigerian expatriates in Canada